Harry Fries and His Musical Saw was an early, experimental television program aired in New York City during 1932. As the title suggests, it consisted of Harry Fries playing the musical saw. Time-slots ranged from 25 minutes to 15 minutes, and it aired on W2XAB (now WCBS-TV).

A technical problem with one of the telecasts was reported in the radio section of several newspapers on 22 April 1932. Fries was wearing a red neck-tie against a white shirt. The red tie photographed as white on the early TV equipment, resulting in a viewer phoned in asking why the performer wasn't dressed properly.

No footage remains of the series, as it aired live, and methods to record live television did not exist until 1947.

References

External links
Harry Fries and His Musical Saw on IMDb

1932 American television series debuts
1932 American television series endings
1930s American television series
American live television series
Lost television shows
American music television series
Black-and-white American television shows